Dillonvale is a census-designated place (CDP) in Sycamore Township, Hamilton County, Ohio, United States. The population was 3,436 at the 2020 census.

Geography
Dillonvale is located at  (39.215959, -84.401296).

Demographics
At the 2000 census there were 3,716 people, 1,612 households, and 1,081 families living in the CDP. The population density was 4,118.2 people per square mile (1,594.2/km). There were 1,636 housing units at an average density of 1,813.1/sq mi (701.8/km).  The racial makeup of the CDP was 96.23% White, 1.61% African American, 0.24% Native American, 0.40% Asian, 0.05% Pacific Islander, 0.38% from other races, and 1.08% from two or more races. Hispanic or Latino of any race were 1.00%.

Of the 1,612 households 26.3% had children under the age of 18 living with them, 54.5% were married couples living together, 10.0% had a female householder with no husband present, and 32.9% were non-families. 29.8% of households were one person and 15.9% were one person aged 65 or older. The average household size was 2.31 and the average family size was 2.86.

The age distribution was 21.1% under the age of 18, 6.0% from 18 to 24, 28.1% from 25 to 44, 21.4% from 45 to 64, and 23.3% 65 or older. The median age was 42 years. For every 100 females, there were 88.1 males. For every 100 females age 18 and over, there were 84.9 males.

The median household income was $45,307 and the median family income  was $52,041. Males had a median income of $42,171 versus $26,357 for females. The per capita income for the CDP was $21,553. About 2.8% of families and 3.8% of the population were below the poverty line, including 2.7% of those under age 18 and 2.8% of those age 65 or over.

References

Census-designated places in Hamilton County, Ohio
Census-designated places in Ohio